Mount Blaxland, actually a hill, is located about 15 kilometres south of Lithgow. It was the furthest point reached by Blaxland, Lawson, and Wentworth on their historic 1813 crossing of the Blue Mountains.

The name was bestowed upon it by Surveyor-General George Evans when, later in 1813, Evans arrived at the terminal point of Blaxland's expedition. Two other smaller conical shaped hills on the opposite side of a nearby stream were named, by Evans, Wentworth's Sugar-Loaf and Lawson's Sugar-Loaf.

Mount Blaxland is located on private property at South Bownfels, south of Lithgow, owned by Glen Ryan. Glen runs cattle on about 1800 hectares of land.

References

External links
 Mt Blaxland. An Interesting Spot. The Sydney Morning Herald 26 December 1929 page 4. Retrieved 9 March 2014.
 
 
 
 

Blaxland